Dragan Trajković (born 7 July 1986) is a Serbian football midfielder.

Career
Born in Leskovac, where he started his football career, in local club Dubočica. He made 9 appearances in his first season. Later he played for Mladost Lučani in two times, both as a loaned player of Dubočica. In the meantime, he was with Sloga Leskovac, Borac Čačak, and Vardar. After second period he spent in Dubočica and Mladost Lučani, he played for Dinamo Vranje, Radnički Niš, and Laçi. Then he returned in Dubočica for the third time. Dubočica dissolved in 2014.

References

External links
 

1986 births
Living people
Sportspeople from Leskovac
Association football midfielders
Serbian footballers
FK Dubočica players
FK Mladost Lučani players
FK Borac Čačak players
FK Dinamo Vranje players
FK Radnički Niš players
Serbian expatriate footballers
Serbian expatriate sportspeople in North Macedonia
Expatriate footballers in North Macedonia
FK Vardar players
Serbian expatriate sportspeople in Albania
Expatriate footballers in Albania
KF Laçi players
Kategoria Superiore players